Archie Sam (June 30, 1914 – May 23, 1986) was a Natchez-Cherokee-Muscogee Creek traditionalist, stomp dance leader, scholar, enrolled member of the United Keetoowah Band of Cherokee Indians, and the Sun Chief of the Natchez Nation.

Early life and military service
Archie Sam was born in the Greenleaf Mountain community near Braggs, Oklahoma on June 30, 1914. Archie was the youngest son of White Tobacco Sam, son of Creek Sam, and his mother was Aggie Cumsey, a fullblood Longhair clan Cherokee. Archie Sam was the grandnephew of Watt Sam, the last native speaker of the Natchez language.

Sam married Maudie Louise Quinton Sam (1914–2006), and the couple had two children, Roy Whayne Sam (1945–2011) and Adeline Naeher.

Sam attended Bacone College in Muskogee and graduated from Connors State College in Warner. He then enlisted in the 45th Infantry Division and in 1940 he served overseas in World War II, participating in special missions at Thule Air Base in northern Greenland where he met and hunted with the Inughuit. After the war he transferred to the United States Air Force where he remained in the Air Force for 21 years before working for the United States Postal Service.

Cultural work
In 1977 Sam worked with professor Charles Van Tuyl to recover sound recordings of Watt Sam that had been archived at the University of Chicago. These are the only known recordings of the Natchez language being spoken.

Upon retiring in 1971, he dedicated himself to the preservation of his indigenous heritage. He was a practitioner of native Natchez religion, and in 1969 he revived the Medicine Springs ceremonial ground, located near Gore, Oklahoma.

Death
Archie Sam died on May 23, 1986 and is buried in the Fort Gibson National Cemetery in Fort Gibson, Oklahoma.

Notes

References
 Mails, Thomas. Cherokee People: The Cherokee People: The Story of the Cherokees from Earliest Origins to Contemporary Times. Council Oak Books, 1996. .
 Nabokov, Peter. Native American Architecture. Oxford: Oxford University Press, 1989. .

Muscogee people
Natchez people
People from Braggs, Oklahoma
1914 births
1986 deaths
Bacone College alumni
Connors State College alumni
United Keetoowah Band people
20th-century Native Americans